Eliza Bromley (née Eliza Nugent) (fl. 1784 - 1803) was an English novelist and translator.

Mrs Bromley was the widow of an army officer.

She is one of the "lost" women writers listed in Dale Spender's Mothers of the Novel: 100 Good Women Writers Before Jane Austen (1986).

Works
Laura and Augustus: an Authentic Story (1784)
Ivey Castle: a novel: containing interesting memoirs of two ladies, late nuns in a French abolished convent (1794)
The Cave of Cosenza: a Romance of the Eighteenth Century (1803) (translated from an Italian original)
The History of Sir Charls Bentinck, Bart. And Louisa Cavendish. A novel, in three volumes. By the author of Laura and Augustus. (1788)

References

18th-century births
19th-century deaths
Year of birth unknown
Year of death unknown
English women novelists
18th-century English novelists
18th-century English women writers
18th-century English writers
19th-century British translators
19th-century English women writers
19th-century English writers
Italian–English translators